Allegra Mostyn-Owen is a British journalist and teacher. She is notable for being the first wife of former British Prime Minister Boris Johnson. 

Mostyn-Owen was born in London to art historian and Christie's Education chairman, William Mostyn-Owen, and Italian writer Gaia Servadio. She was raised by her parents alongside her two brothers, Orlando and Owen. During her time as an undergraduate student at Trinity College, Oxford she worked as a journalist and met Johnson. Mostyn-Owen and Johnson married in 1987, divorcing in 1993. She remarried in 2010.

Education and career
Mostyn-Owen attended Trinity College, Oxford, matriculating in 1983. She studied Philosophy, Politics and Economics as an undergraduate. Students often spoke of her as one of Oxford's most beautiful women. Subsequent modelling assignments included being photographed by David Bailey for the cover of Tatler magazine and by Terence Donovan for Vogue. She was on the books of the Models1 modelling agency in London.

Her career in journalism began when she became the joint student editor of Oxford's Isis magazine in 1985.

After graduating, Mostyn-Owen began working for the Evening Standard. She worked on the paper's gossip column "Londoner's Diary" resigning the following April. She gained a master's degree in EU Law from the Université libre de Bruxelles.

After divorce from Johnson, Mostyn-Owen embarked on a career teaching Muslim women English and art at the Minhaj-UI-Quran Mosque in East London. Shortly after, she persuaded mosque elders to let her start art classes for boys and girls aged five to 14. In 2010, Mostyn-Owen spoke at a public event on the closing of the Muslim Mind and the audience was reportedly gripped by her "creative and kindly" personality.

She creates ceramics in her studio in West London. She developed her ceramics through adult education in Hammersmith and Fulham and one-to-one tuition from Seth Cardew at Wenford Bridge.

Relationship with Boris Johnson
Mostyn-Owen met Boris Johnson halfway through their first year at Oxford University. The pair met as a result of a supposed error on his part. He was invited to a party that she co-hosted but arrived at on the wrong night with a bottle of wine. She was reading an Economics textbook when he showed up at her door. Mostyn-Owen recalled their exchange, "There's this stranger at the door who goes, oh, oh, oh, oh, oh." I'd never met him but he said he'd seen me at a Union debate." The pair drank the bottle he had brought and talked for several hours. There were "lots of good jokes and lots of bad jokes."

Their relationship developed and she considered him her best friend. They exchanged notes several times a day after they met. These notes often contained "little rhyming couplets".

They went on to date throughout university and were a "golden, glossy, head-turning double act". The pair were often described as the "perfect couple" as she was "the girl from the cover of Tatler" and he was "the future prime minister". 
 
There is a photo of the pair attending The Sultans Ball at Oxford Town Hall in March 1986 in photographer Dafydd Jones's book Oxford: The Last Hurrah. Jones explained that he had taken their picture because "they looked very comfortable with each other."

The pair decided early on in their relationship to get married. They were both 23 and were the youngest of their Oxford set to marry. They were married on 5 September 1987, and their wedding was held at St Michael and All Angels, West Felton in Shropshire. At their wedding, a violinist and a viola player played a piece composed for the occasion by the highly regarded composer, Hans Werner Henze, titled "Allegra e Boris – Duetto Concertante per Violino e Viola all’Occasione Delle Loro Faustissime Nozze il 5 Settembre, 1987". The daughter of Rod Steiger and Claire Bloom, Anna Steiger, sang from The Marriage of Figaro.

The reception was held at the Mostyn-Owens' country house, a grade II-listed estate called Woodhouse, sitting on 1,500 acres. She wore flowers through her hair, whilst Johnson arrived with borrowed trousers. The media portrayed their wedding as perfect, with the Daily Mail describing it "as a cross between La Dolce Vita and Brideshead Revisited." However, she considered the day of their wedding "the end of their relationship rather than the beginning."

After spending their honeymoon in Egypt, they settled in West Kensington and Johnson began working for The Times whilst Mostyn-Owen joined the Evening Standard. Mostyn-Owen's job was overshadowed by Johnson's who was reportedly "married to his job". According to Mostyn-Owen, Johnson showed neither sympathy nor interest in her career, and she found herself sitting alone in their apartment rarely spending an evening with her husband. She would often not know where he was, "The really bad times were when he didn't tell me he was going to be away."

In the summer of 1989, Mostyn-Owen finished her law exams and travelled to Brussels with Johnson after he became the European correspondent for The Daily Telegraph. During their six years of marriage, the pair broke up once and when Marina Wheeler became pregnant with Johnson's child in 1993, Mostyn-Owen ended their relationship.

Mostyn-Owen and Johnson had no contact following their divorce until he began inviting her for "periodic lunches". After hearing the news about Mostyn-Owen's second marriage, he rang to congratulate her and when he was seeking re-election as London Mayor, he recruited her as part of his Muslim Engagement Taskforce. In an interview with the Evening Standard, Mostyn-Owen claimed "he's a better ex than he was a husband".

Second marriage
Since marrying her second husband, who is from Pakistan, Mostyn-Owen explained,  and that she found it "very rewarding to have this whole connection with Pakistan." Mostyn-Owen remains Christian and has "never been tempted to convert to Islam herself."

References

1964 births
Living people
20th-century British journalists
Alumni of Trinity College, Oxford
21st-century British women artists
British people of Italian-Jewish descent
Université libre de Bruxelles alumni
Spouses of prime ministers of the United Kingdom